Phyllonorycter kurokoi is a moth of the family Gracillariidae. It is known from Kyushu island of Japan.

The wingspan is 7-7.5 mm.

The larvae feed as leaf miners on Acer mono. The mine is situated on the lower surface of the leaf.

References

kurokoi
Moths of Japan

Moths described in 1963
Taxa named by Tosio Kumata
Leaf miners